{{DISPLAYTITLE:C2H6S2}}
The molecular formula C2H6S2 (molar mass: 94.20 g/mol, exact mass: 93.99109 u) may refer to:

 Dimethyl disulfide (DMDS)
 1,1-Ethanedithiol
 1,2-Ethanedithiol (EDT)